The epithet "the Mild" may refer to:

Gautrekr the Mild, a legendary Geatish king
Halfdan the Mild, a Norwegian petty king of Romerike and Vestfold
Henry the Mild, Duke of Brunswick-Lüneburg (died 1416), a prince during the latter part of his life
John III, Count of Holstein-Plön (c. 1297–1359)
Otto the Mild, Duke of Brunswick-Lüneburg (1282–1344)

See also
List of people known as the Peaceful
List of people known as the Gentle
List of people known as the Wild

Lists of people by epithet